The Purple Hills (originally titled "The Vanishing Frontier") is a 1961 American Western film directed by Maury Dexter and written by Russ Bender and Edith Cash Pearl. The film stars Gene Nelson, Kent Taylor, Danny Zapien, Medford Salway, Russ Bender and Joanna Barnes. The film was released in November 1961, by 20th Century Fox.

Plot

After killing wanted outlaw A.J. Beaumont, a claim for a $8,225 reward is put in by Gil Shepard, then also by Johnny Barnes, the dead man's partner. While the sheriff tries to decide whose claim is valid, teenaged Martin Beaumont turns up, looking to avenge his brother's death. They also meet Amy Carter, who is attracted to Shepard.

After a discovery that Beaumont had been doing business with Apaches, it's clear even to Martin that his brother was a lawbreaker. Barnes shoots the sheriff, but Shepard gets the better of him and also gets the girl.

Cast 
Gene Nelson as Gil Shepard
Kent Taylor as Johnny Barnes
Danny Zapien as Chito
Medford Salway as Young Brave
Russ Bender as Deputy Marshal
Joanna Barnes as Amy Carter
Jerry Summers as Martin Beaumont
Jack Carr as A.J. Beaumont

Production
The movie was one of the first three in a new eight-picture deal between API and 20th Century Fox, the others being Desire in the Dust and Freckles.

The Purple Hills was a remake of a 1915 film.

It was shot in Apacheland, Arizona. Dexter called it  "a very simple little trek Western."

References

External links 
 

1961 films
1960s English-language films
20th Century Fox films
American Western (genre) films
1961 Western (genre) films
Films directed by Maury Dexter
Films scored by Richard LaSalle
1960s American films